The Roman Catholic Diocese of Batouri is a diocese located in the city of Batouri in the Ecclesiastical province of Bertoua in Cameroon. Its seat is the Cathédrale Notre-Dame in Batouri.It has an area of 15,981 square kilometers, with 205,000 inhabitants (47,000 Catholics), 11 parishes, 27 priests (21 diocesan, 2 religious, and 4 Fidei donum), 13 religious brothers, 17 seminarians, and 31 religious sisters.

History
 February 3, 1994: Established as Diocese of Batouri from the Diocese of Bertoua

Leadership
 Bishops of Batouri (Roman rite), in reverse chronological order
 Bishop Marcellin-Marie Ndabnyemb (April 25, 2018 -)
 Bishop Faustin Ambassa Ndjodo, C.I.C.M. (December 3, 2009  – October 22, 2016), appointed Archbishop of Garoua
 Fr. Vital Pierre Nkenlifack (Apostolic Administrator 01.2008 – December 3, 2009)
 Bishop Samuel Kleda (October 23, 2000, – November 3, 2007), appointed Coadjutor Archbishop of Douala
 Bishop Roger Pirenne (February 3, 1994  – June 3, 1999), appointed Archbishop of Bertoua

See also
Roman Catholicism in Cameroon

References

External links
 Official diocesan website (French) 
 GCatholic.org

Roman Catholic dioceses in Cameroon
Christian organizations established in 1994
Roman Catholic dioceses and prelatures established in the 20th century
Roman Catholic Ecclesiastical Province of Bertoua